Srikalahasti revenue division is an administrative division in the Tirupati district of the Indian state of Andhra Pradesh.This division headquarters is located at Srikalahasti .It is one of the four revenue divisions in the district and comprises eight mandals. It was formed on 4 April 2022 along with the newly formed Tirupati district.

Administration 
The revenue division comprises eight mandals: K. V. B. Puram, Nagalapuram, Narayanavanam, Pichatur, Renigunta, Srikalahasti, Thottambedu, and Yerpedu.

See also 
List of revenue divisions in Andhra Pradesh
List of mandals in Andhra Pradesh
Tirupati district
Tirupati revenue division
Sullurupeta revenue division
Gudur revenue division

References 

2022 establishments in Andhra Pradesh
Revenue divisions in Tirupati district